Jumping Lake is a lake a short distance south of Birch Hills, Saskatchewan, Canada. It is a small freshwater lake popular locally for migratory bird hunting, and fishing. In addition to being a stopping point for migrating geese and ducks, the lake is home to a population of walleye which occasionally suffer from winterkill. In the mid decades of the twentieth century a beach and recreational facilities existed at the lake frequented by area locals, but these have since been abandoned. The village of Waitville, Saskatchewan was also once found at the eastern edge of the lake which has disappeared for the most part. The countryside surrounding Jumping Lake is typical of the aspen parkland biome of which it is a part.

See also
List of lakes of Saskatchewan
Birch Hills, Saskatchewan

External links
 

Invergordon No. 430, Saskatchewan
Lakes of Saskatchewan
Division No. 15, Saskatchewan